Saint Hilary may refer to:

People
 Hilary of Poitiers (c. 310–c. 367), Bishop of Poitiers and a Doctor of the Church
 Hilary of Arles (c. 403–449), Bishop of Arles
 Hilary of Galeata (476–558)

Other uses
 St Hilary, Cornwall, England, a village and civil parish
 St Hilary's Church, St Hilary (Cornwall), a Grade I listed Anglican church
 St Hilary, Vale of Glamorgan, Wales, a village
 Church of St Hilary, St Hilary (Vale of Glamorgan), a Grade II* listed Anglican church
 Saint Hilary School, a Roman Catholic school in Chicago, Illinois, United States

See also
 Old Saint Hilary's Church, Marin County, California, United States